St. Mary's Church, Belfast is a Grade B-1 listed  Roman Catholic church located in Chapel Lane/Smithfield area of Belfast, Northern Ireland. A church was opened on this site in May 1784 and thus it is the mother church for the city of Belfast. At the time, it was the only Roman Catholic church in the then town of Belfast after the relaxation of some of the Penal Laws. The church grounds contain an undistinguished grotto dedicated to Our Lady of Lourdes. Until 2022 St. Mary's was a mensal parish of the Diocese of Down and Connor.

History 
In the census of 1782, there were only 365 Catholics recorded living in Belfast. Following a collection from the local Church of Ireland and Presbyterian congregations, funds were donated to the building of St. Mary's Church.

The first Mass was celebrated on 30 May 1784 - a Sunday - by Father Hugh O’Donnell, the first Parish Priest of Belfast. In the opening ceremony, a company of the Irish Volunteers, led by Waddell Cunningham, lined the chapel yard and escorted Father O'Donnell into the building.

In 1813, the church's pulpit was donated by the Anglican Vicar of Belfast, Canon Turner, continuing the positive relationship between the Roman Catholic church and the local Protestant congregations. Later, in 1815, St. Patrick's Church was built to accommodate the growing Catholic population of the city.

As Belfast's Catholic population grew after the famine, the church was deemed too small and thus architect John O'Neill was contracted to design a church big enough for the burgeoning congregation.

Although none of the original church can be seen, in 1868 the church was enlarged and renovated into a new Romanesque style building. The principal changes in this enlargement were the addition of five bays, a porch, a ninety feet high tower the very distinct apsidal sanctuary: the building was brought forward to within a few feet of street, entailing demolition of sacristan's cottage.

Twentieth Century

Renovation work with a new staircase, confessionals and sacristy with all the work undertaken by the Belfast-based architect Padraig Gregory commenced in the late 1930s and it was planned to open the renovated church in May 1941 but the Belfast Blitz several days beforehand forced the cancellation of the re-opening by Bishop Daniel Mageean. This renovation was the occasion of a very fine history of the church and parish by Rev Patrick Rogers (priest). A new date stone was placed over the doorway in the form of a Potent cross stating; ‘FIDEM / SERVAVI / 1783 / 1868 / 1941’ 

In the Marian Year of 1954 a Grotto to Our Lady of Lourdes was established under the auspices of the then Administrator, Fr Bernard MacLaverty - an uncle of the Belfast novelist of the same name. The grotto was created in the gardens surrounding the church by Padraig Gregory.

To mark the bicentenary the sanctuary was renovated in 1983 with work by artist Roy Carroll, a favourite of Cahal Daly, much of this timber furniture was later removed after Daly's departure from the Diocese of Down and Connor.

In May–August 2017, the church underwent a substantial renovation work to repair the roof and walls, and to repave the grotto area.

Present Day 
For almost forty years the church was served by clergy from the Mill Hill Fathers, the last of whom left in 2019.   The current Parish Priest is Fr. Timothy Bartlett  assisted by a range of retired clergy.

The church holds two masses a day from Sunday - Monday, and three a day on Friday and Saturday. The 6pm Mass on both Friday and Saturday is celebrated in the Irish language.

References 

Churches in Belfast
Roman Catholic churches in Belfast
Shrines to the Virgin Mary
Grade B+ listed buildings
Roman Catholic churches completed in 1784
Grade B1 listed buildings
18th-century Roman Catholic church buildings in the United Kingdom
Religious organizations established in 1784